is a Japanese wheelchair athlete.

Career 
Hokinoue's career began at the age of 30, ten years after he sustained a spinal cord injury in a motorcycle accident.

His first major championship marathon was at the 2008 Summer Paralympics, where he placed 6th with a time of 1:23:22.  His marathon best is 1:23:16, which he attained at the 2011 Seoul International Marathon.

He won the 2013 Boston Marathon's Wheelchair Men's portion, with a time of 1:25:33.

Personal life 
Yamamoto is married and has a son.  Yamamoto's nickname is "Hiro-san".

References

External links 
 

1966 births
Living people
People with paraplegia
Japanese male wheelchair racers
Paralympic wheelchair racers
Athletes (track and field) at the 2008 Summer Paralympics
Athletes (track and field) at the 2012 Summer Paralympics
Athletes (track and field) at the 2016 Summer Paralympics
Paralympic athletes of Japan